South Carolina Highway 9 (SC 9) is a  major state highway in the U.S. state of South Carolina. The highway travels from Cherry Grove Beach to the North Carolina state line upstate. The highway is currently the longest state highway in South Carolina. It is signed as a north–south highway, even though it travels in an east–west direction.

Route description

SC 9 begins at the North Carolina-South Carolina border, where the road continues as NC 9. This is about twelve miles (19 km) northwest of Spartanburg.

The road slowly heads southeast to Spartanburg. Five miles into its existence SC 9 intersects SC 11 and then two miles (3 km) later, SC 9 intersects SC 292. After this, SC 9 enters Boiling Springs.

Finally, SC 9 enters the northeast section of Spartanburg and crosses over Interstate 85 and Interstate 585. Then SC 9 joins up with US Route 176. While concurrent, it intersects US Route 29 and a couple of other state highways. Finally, after the ten-mile concurrency with US Route 176 ends, SC 9 leaves the Spartanburg metro.

About 1.5 miles (2.5 km) east of this concurrency, SC 9 intersects SC 150 in downtown Pacolet. In another five miles (8 km) or so, SC 9 enters Jonesville, where SC 9 merges with SC 18. SC 9 merges off SC 18 nearly a mile out of town.

On the way there, SC 9 runs across SC 114 and SC 105. Once in downtown Lockhart, SC 9 merges with SC 49 for nearly a half-mile.

The next town is six miles to the east. That town is Chester. There SC 9 avoids the city by going south and merging with SC 97 and SC 121 Bypass.

Eight miles east of Chester, SC 9 crosses over Interstate 77 and enters Richburg. SC 9 merges with SC 901 for about a mile. Once in downtown, SC 9 turns left and out of Richburg. It then enters Fort Lawn, where it goes under US Route 21.

SC 9 then enters the rapidly growing city of Lancaster. Right before it enters town, SC 9 Business spreads off. SC 9 then meets/crosses over US Route 521 and SC 200.

Finally, SC 9 enters the rural area of north central SC and rolls through the countryside at interstate speeds, with the biggest thing on the road to Pageland being an intersection with SC 522. While entering Pageland, SC 9 merges with US Route 601. US 601 merges off with SC 151 in downtown Pageland.

SC 9 is the northern terminus of SC 268 in Mt. Croghan It is another mile to Ruby, during which SC 9 is concurrent with SC 109.

SC 9 curves left when it serves as the eastern terminus to SC 265 one mile (1.6 km) from Ruby. Having turned east, SC 9 enters Chesterfield, South Carolina. Once again, it breaks off in a business route and then it meets SC 102 and SC 145.

SC 9 then proceeds onto Cheraw. While entering downtown, SC 9 merges with US Route 52 and then onto US Route 1 to get out of town. SC 9 merges off US 1 after downtown, and SC 9 heads east, where it shortly meets SC 177 and then SC 79.

Seven miles southeast of Cheraw, SC 9 runs into Bennettsville. SC 9 merges with SC 38 for one mile (1.6 km), entering downtown Bennettsville, where SC 9 runs eastward with US Route 401 for nearly a mile before merging off again. There is another SC 9 Business Route.

SC 9 then proceeds onto the tiny town of Clio where the main intersection is with SC 381.

Nearly seven miles later, after merging SC 57, SC 9/57 crosses under I-95 and enters Dillon. There SC 9/57 merges with US Route 301 before all three go their separate ways.

A further ten miles (16 km) to the east, SC 9 meets up with SC 41 in Lake View, South Carolina. Here SC 9 comes very close to the NC border (about two miles (3 km) south), but as soon as SC 9 leaves town, it heads due south into deep rural land for nine to ten miles (16 km).

Finally, SC 9 enters Nichols where it merges with US Route 76 for a little more than a mile. Another six miles (10 km) goes by before SC 9 begins to enter the beach zone, as another SC 9 Business Route merges off. With SC 9 Bus, SC 9 is able to avoid downtown Loris, go by the Twin City Airport, and have an interchange with US Route 701.

After meeting back up with its Business Route, SC 9 heads towards the NC border, this time as close as a mile. Yet again, SC 9 bends south where it meets SC 905 in Longs, an interchange with SC 31; and then heads into downtown North Myrtle Beach. There it crosses over US Route 17 and SC 90 and goes through one mile (1.6 km) of beach, where it continues as SC 65 along the beachfront.

History
Established in 1922 as an original state highway, it traversed from SC 23 in Dillon, west to SC 10, in Enoree.  By 1926, SC 9 was extended east to Lake View, then replacing SC 47 to Green Sea, then southeast on new primary routing to Little River.  On its northern end, SC 9 rerouted from Kelly to SC 19, near Spartanburg, replacing SC 92.  The route from Kelly to Enoree was renumbered SC 92.

In 1927, SC 9 was rerouted between Pageland to Lancaster on a more southern route, avoiding the Tradesville area; The old alignment was briefly downgraded to secondary before being renumbered as SC 906. In 1933, SC 9 was realigned on a straight path from Loris to Little River; most of the old route was downgraded to secondary, with exception to Wampee and eastward becoming SC 90.  In 1936, SC 9 was extended north through Spartanburg and Boiling Springs to its current northern terminus at the North Carolina state line; replacing SC 177.

In 1940, SC 9 was extended south as a new primary routing to Cherry Grove Beach.  Between 1943 and 1946, SC 9 was rerouted onto Pine Street between Pacolet to Spartanburg; the old route was downgraded to secondary, but then later became SC 295 in 1948. In 1947, it replaced the part of SC 100 in Chesterfield. In 1948, SC 9 south end was truncated at US 17, at Nixons Crossroads; the route to Cherry Grove Beach was downgraded.  In 1949, SC 9 was given a southern bypass of Chesterfield, leaving its first business loop through the downtown (since decommissioned).  Also in that same year, SC 9 was moved on a more direct routing between Pageland to Lancaster, replacing SC 906; the old routing was renumbered as SC 902 and SC 903 (today US 601).

In 1956, SC 9 was given a southern bypass of Chester, leaving a business loop through downtown.  By 1962, SC 9 was rerouted in Spartanburg, utilizing Pine Street to Interstate 585, then north along Boiling Springs Road.  Part of the old routing through the downtown area became part of SC 56.  By 1967, SC 9 was given a northern bypass of Lancaster, leaving a business loop through downtown.  In 1974, SC 9 was rerouted north into Dillon via US 301/US 501; leaving 3rd Avenue (later becoming Martin Luther King Jr. Boulevard).

From 1982-1985, SC 9 moved onto bypass route from Loris to Green Sea, leaving a business loop through downtown Loris.  Also around that same time, SC 9 was moved onto a western bypass of Bennettsville, leaving a business loop through downtown.  By 1988, SC 9 was re-extended to its current southern terminus at Cherry Grove Beach, replacing part of SC 65.

Major intersections

Special routes

Loris business loop

SC 9 Bus. then heads into downtown Loris, the downtown being at the intersection with U.S. Route 701 (US 701). As soon as SC 9 Bus. passes US 701, it heads  back to SC 9.

Lake View connector route

South Carolina Highway 9 Connector (SC 9 Conn.) is a  connector route in the northern part of Lake View that is an unsigned highway. It begins at an intersection with the SC 9 where it turns left off of South Main Street and onto West 3rd Avenue. It travels to the north on South Main Street to an intersection with SC 41, where it turns left off of Richard Temple Boulevard and onto North Main Street.

Bennettsville business loop

SC 9 Bus. heads straight into downtown Bennettsville, where just before downtown SC 9 merges with SC 385. There it travels just north of downtown before moving south in the outskirts of town and ends again at SC 9.

Cheraw alternate route

South Carolina Highway 9 Alternate (SC 9 Alt.) was an alternate route that existed in the central part of Cheraw. It was established around 1942 on Kershaw Street between US 1/US 52 and SC 9. It was decommissioned in 1947 and was downgraded to a secondary road.

Cheraw truck route

South Carolina Highway 9 Truck (SC 9 Truck) is a  truck route partially within the northeastern part of Cheraw. It is entirely within the northeastern part of Chesterfield County. It begins at an intersection with US 1/SC 9 (Powe Street). This intersection is also the northern terminus of US 1 Truck. From this point, US 52 Truck and SC 9 Truck travel to the northwest. They travel through a residential area of the city. They curve to the west-northwest and intersect US 52 (Second Street). Here, US 52 Truck ends, and SC 9 Truck turns right and follows US 52 to the northwest. They cross over Huckleberry Branch on the Patrolman Gilbert "Gil" Halma Bridge. Here, they leave the city limits proper of Cheraw, but still travel along the eastern edge of the city. After they leave the city for good, they intersect the northern terminus of Four-Mile Loop Road. Here, SC 9 splits off to the southwest. It travels through a rural part of the county. It curves to the south-southeast and meets its northern terminus, another intersection with SC 9.

Chesterfield business loop

South Carolina Highway 9 Business was a business loop along Main Street in Chesterfield.  Established in 1949, when SC 9 was moved onto new road, bypassing south of Main Street; however, by 1956, SC 9 Business was already decommissioned.  Though official maps from the state show that Main Street is a secondary road (SC-S-13-1), some online mapping sites still label it as a branch of SC 9.

Lancaster alternate route

South Carolina Highway 9 Alternate (SC 9 Alt.) was an alternate route that existed in the northern part of Lancaster. It was established around 1942 between US 521 south of the city to where US 521 and SC 9 split north of downtown. It was decommissioned in 1947 and was downgraded to a secondary road. Today, its path is part of US 521 and SC 9 Business (SC 9 Bus.).

Lancaster business loop

SC 9 Bus. merges onto U.S. Route 521 (US 521) for one block and then merges back off, crosses over SC 200, and quickly SC 9 Bus. is out of downtown on East Arch Street. A  after crossing over SC 200, SC 9 Bus. ends at SC 9. Other than Spartanburg, the City of Lancaster is the largest urban area SC 9 travels through before reaching the North Myrtle Beach area.

Richburg alternate route

South Carolina Highway 9 Alternate (SC 9 Alt.) was an alternate route that existed in the central part of Richburg. It was established in 1939 between SC 9 and SC 901. It was decommissioned in 1947 and was downgraded to a secondary road.

Chester business loop

South Carolina Highway 9 Business (SC 9 Bus.) is a business route in the city of Chester. Like all the numbered highways in Chester, it goes straight through downtown, and the bypass route makes a half-moon path around Chester. SC 9 Bus. shares a brief concurrency with US 321 Bus./SC 97 Bus., and then with SC 72/SC 121 Bus.

Jonesville alternate route

South Carolina Highway 9 Alternate (SC 9 Alt.) was an alternate route that existed in the northern part of Jonesville. It was established in 1938 on Church Street between SC 9 and SC 11. It was decommissioned in 1947 and was downgraded to a secondary road. Today, it is known as SC 9 Connector.

Jonesville connector route

South Carolina Highway 9 Connector (SC 9 Conn.) is a  connector route in the north-central part of Jonesville, in the northwestern part of Union County. It is a brief link between the SC 9 mainline (Main Street) and SC 18 (Pacolet Street). It is unsigned for its entire length. It begins at an intersection with the SC 9 mainline (Main Street). It takes Church Street in a roughly northwestern direction. It immediately crosses over some railroad tracks of Norfolk Southern Railway. It provides rear access for a textile company. Then, it reaches its northern terminus, an intersection with SC 18 (Pacolet Street).

Spartanburg alternate route

South Carolina Highway 9 Alternate (SC 9 Alt.) was an alternate route that existed near Pacolet. It was established in 1946 between SC 9 near Pacolet and US 176 (now SC 56) in Spartanburg. It was decommissioned in 1947 and was downgraded to a secondary road. Today, it is partially known as SC 295.

See also

References

External links

009
Transportation in Horry County, South Carolina
Transportation in Marion County, South Carolina
Transportation in Dillon County, South Carolina
Transportation in Marlboro County, South Carolina
Transportation in Chesterfield County, South Carolina
Transportation in Lancaster County, South Carolina
Transportation in Chester County, South Carolina
Transportation in Union County, South Carolina
Transportation in Spartanburg County, South Carolina
Chesterfield, South Carolina